The IWGP Tag Team Championship is a professional wrestling tag team championship owned by the New Japan Pro-Wrestling (NJPW) promotion. "IWGP" are the initials of NJPW's governing body, the International Wrestling Grand Prix. The title was introduced on December 12, 1985, at a NJPW live event.  The IWGP Heavyweight Tag Team Championship is not the only tag team title contested for in NJPW; the IWGP Junior Heavyweight Tag Team Championship is also sanctioned by NJPW. According to NJPW's official website, the IWGP Tag Team Championship is considered the "IWGP Heavy Weight Class", while the Junior Heavyweight Tag Team Championship is listed as the "IWGP Jr. Tag Class". Like most professional wrestling championships, the title is won via the result of a scripted match. Title changes usually happen at NJPW-promoted events; although the title has only changed hands twice at a non-NJPW event, it has been defended in several other promotions.

Hiroyoshi Tenzan currently holds the record for most reigns by an individual wrestler, with twelve. Tenzan's combined twelve reign lengths add up to 1,988 days, which is the most of any champion. At seven reigns, Guerrillas of Destiny (Tama Tonga and Tanga Loa) hold the record for most by a team. Tenzan and Masahiro Chono's combined five reign lengths add up to 1,010 days (the most of any team). At  days, Bad Intentions' (Giant Bernard and Karl Anderson) only reign is the longest in the title's history. Keiji Mutoh and Shiro Koshinaka's only reign is the shortest, at six days. Currently, Bad Intentions' only reign has the most defenses, with ten. Overall, there have been 96 reigns shared among 85 wrestlers, who made up 63 different teams. Bishamon (Hirooki Goto and Yoshi-Hashi) are the current champions in their second reign. They defeated FTR (Cash Wheeler and Dax Harwood) on January 4, 2022 at Wrestle Kingdom 17 in Tokyo, Japan

Title history

Combined reigns 

By team

By wrestler

Footnotes

References
General

Specific

External links
njpw.co.jp

New Japan Pro-Wrestling championships
Professional wrestling tag team champion lists